Benoît Potier (born 3 September 1957) is a French businessman who served as CEO of the French multinational industrial gas company Air Liquide between 2006 and 2022. He is currently Chairman of the Board of Directors of Air Liquide SA.

Education 
BPotier graduated with an engineer's degree from École Centrale Paris in 1979. Potier also attended the executive training program of the Wharton International Forum and the INSEAD Advanced Management program.

Professional career 
Benoît Potier joined Air Liquide in 1981 as a Research and Development engineer. After serving as a Project Manager in the Engineering and Construction Division, he was made Vice-President of Energy Development in the Large Industries business line. In 1993, he became Director of Strategy & Organization and, in 1994, was put in charge of the Chemicals, Metal & Steel, Oil and Energy Markets. He was made an Executive Vice-President of Air Liquide in 1995 with additional responsibilities over the Engineering & Construction Division and the Large Industries operations in Europe. Benoît Potier was appointed Senior Executive Vice-President in 1997. He was appointed to the Board of Directors in 2000 and became Chairman of the Management Board in November 2001. Benoît Potier served as Chairman and Chief Executive Officer of Air Liquide from 2006 to 2022. He has been holding the office of Chairman of the Board of Directors of Air Liquide since June 1st, 2022.

Other activities

Corporate boards
 Siemens, Member of the Supervisory Board (since 2018)

Non-profit organizations
 Ecole Centrale des Arts et Manufactures de Paris, Member of the Board
 Association Nationale des Societes par Actions (ANSA), Member of the Board 
 Association Française des Entreprises Privées (AFEP), Member of the Board 
 Cercle de l’Industrie, Member of the Board
 INSEAD, Member of the French Board 
 La Fabrique de l’Industrie, Member of the Board  
 European Roundtable of Industrialists (ERT), Vice-chairman

Recognition
Potier has been awarded with France's Knight of the French Legion of honour “Chevalier de la Légion d'Honneur” and with the distinction of  “Officier de l’Ordre du Mérite” in 2006.

References

External links
 Category:French businesspeople

1957 births
Living people
Air Liquide people
Siemens people
Groupe Danone people
Michelin people
Businesspeople from Mulhouse
École Centrale Paris alumni
INSEAD alumni
French chief executives
Officiers of the Légion d'honneur
Officers of the Ordre national du Mérite